Rebecca Garcia may refer to:
 Rebecca Garcia (computer programmer), American computer programmer
Rebecca Garcia (politician) (born 1973), Brazilian economist and politician